Wickliffe High School is a public high school in Wickliffe, Ohio. It is the only high school in the Wickliffe City School District.

Athletics
Wickliffe High School athletic teams compete in the Chagrin Valley Conference. Wickliffe's mascot is the Blue Devil.

On October 10, 2006, the boys varsity soccer team, coached by Chris Adkins, won its first CVC conference title defeating Chagrin Falls, 2–0.  The soccer team went on to reach the division three state championship game which they lost to Worthington Christian in a penalty kick shootout. In 2013, the boys varsity baseball team beat Garrettsville Garfield to win the school's first baseball district championship since 1989.

In 2013, the girls’ track team won its second straight CVC conference title.

In 2016, the boys’ football team clinched and made in the division five OHSSA State Playoffs

In 2017, the football team clinched and made the division five OHSAA State Playoffs.

Ohio High School Athletic Association State Championships
 Boys Baseball — 1974

References

External links
 District Website
 The Wickleaf

High schools in Lake County, Ohio
Public high schools in Ohio